Hussein Ali Hassan Moustafa (born 19 March 1982) is an Egyptian professional footballer who plays as a centre midfielder for Egyptian Premier League club ENPPI.

References

External links
 Yallakora
 Hussein Ali at Gouna official site 

Living people
Egyptian footballers
1982 births
ENPPI SC players
Association football midfielders